= Diope =

Ancient Arcadian town

Diope (Ancient Greek: Διόπη) was a town of ancient Arcadia mentioned by Stephanus of Byzantium.

Its site is unlocated.
